Sheikh Mohammed al-Ghazali al-Saqqa (1917–1996), was an Islamic scholar whose writings "have influenced generations of Egyptians". The author of 94 books, he attracted a broad following with works that sought to interpret Islam and its holy book, the Qur'an, in a modern light. He is widely credited with contributing to a revival of Islamic faith in Egypt in recent times. Another sources have called him "one of the most revered sheikhs in the Muslim world".

Early life

Al-Ghazali was born in 1917 in the small town of Nikla al-'Inab (نكلا العنب), southeast of the coastal part of Alexandria, in the Beheira Governorate. He graduated from Al Azhar University in 1941. He taught at the University of Umm al-Qura in Makkah, the University of Qatar, and at al-Amir 'Abd al-Qadir University for Islamic Sciences in Algeria.

Works and awards

Sheikh al-Ghazali held the post of chairman of the Academic Council of the International Institute of Islamic Thought in Cairo. Sheikh al-Ghazali authored more than sixty books, many of which have been translated into various languages.

He was also the recipient of many awards, including the First Order of the Republic (Egypt) (1988), the King Faisal Award (1989) and the Excellence Award from Pakistan.

Personal life and death
He was married to Lady Amina Kouta; their seven children included two boys and five girls. He was buried in Medina, Saudi Arabia. He was a popular Sheikh in Egypt and remained so after his death.

Works
Some of his books include:
 Islam and the Modern Economy
 Islam and Political Despotism
 An encyclopedic work called "Fanaticism and Tolerance Between Christianity and Islam"
 Fiqh Al Seerah
 Tafsir on the Qur'an
 Laisa Minal Islam (Not From Islam)
 Our Intellectual Heritage
 Renew Your Life
 Islam and Women's Issues
 The Prophetic Sunna: Between the Jurists and the Hadith Scholars (al-Sunna al-nabawiyya bayna ahl al-fiqh wa ahl al-hadith (Cairo, 1989, 2nd edn. 1990))

The Prophetic Sunna

Al-Ghazali's work The Prophetic Sunna, was "an immediate focus of attention and controversy" when it was published in 1989. It became a best seller, with five impressions made by the publisher in its first five months and a second enlarged edition within a year. Within two years "at least seven monographs were published in response to the book." al-Ahram newspaper compared it to Perestroika restructuring going on in the Soviet Union at that time.

In addition to practical concerns of revivalists—sharia position on economics and taxation, criminal law, the veiling of women, and their place in society and the economy—Al-Ghazli wrote of how to "purify sunna of adulterations". Rather than upending the science of hadith criticism, he sought to redress imbalances in scholars' understanding of it.

Nonetheless, the book's "severe" criticism of what Al-Ghazali believed to be the "literalism, and anti-interpretive approach to Islamic texts" of the Ahl al-Hadith (partisans of hadith) prompted sharp attacks from Islamists even more conservative than Al-Ghazali. "Several major conferences ... in Egypt and Saudi Arabia" criticizing the book, long articles in response in the Saudi-owned London-based newspaper Asharq Al-Awsat, and assorted writings of others condemning al-Ghazali and questioning "his motives and competence." According to one of his students — Khaled Abou El Fadl — Al-Ghazali was stunned, and disheartened by what he thought was a smear campaign against him and by the silence of his old students.

See also 
 Farag Foda
 Muhammad Metwalli al-Sha'rawi
 Mustafa Mahmoud

References

External links 
 (Arabic)

Hanafis
Maturidis
Asharis
Dissidents of the Muslim Brotherhood
Al-Azhar University alumni
Egyptian Sunni Muslim scholars of Islam
Sunni imams
Egyptian imams
20th-century imams
1917 births
1996 deaths